The Khazar Lankaran 2014-15 season is Khazar Lankaran's tenth Azerbaijan Premier League season. They will participate in the Premier League and the Azerbaijan Cup.

Oğuz Çetin was appointed as the club's manager on 5 June 2014, following the mutual termination of Mustafa Denizli's contract at the end of the 2013–14 season. resigning as manager on 22 December, with Elbrus Mammadov taking over as manager.

Squad
Out on loan

Transfers
Summer

In:

 

Out:

Winter

In:

Out:

Friendlies

Competitions
Azerbaijan Premier League

Results summary

Results

League table

Azerbaijan Cup

Squad statistics

Appearances and goals

|-
|colspan="14"|Players who appeared for Khazar Lankaran no longer at the club:''

|}

Goal scorers

Disciplinary record

Notes 

Qarabağ have played their home games at the Tofiq Bahramov Stadium since 1993 due to the ongoing situation in Quzanlı.
Araz-Naxçıvan were excluded from the Azerbaijan Premier League on 17 November 2014, with all their results being annulled.

References

External links
Khazar Lankaran at Soccerway.com

Khazar
Khazar Lankaran FK seasons